Ratu Nemia Vunimakadre Vainitoba is a Fijian chief from Nakavu Village in the Nadi area of Ba Province.  Holding the titles of Tai Vuni and Sau Turaga (Kingmaker), his traditional role is to install the Chief of the village.  Throughout his long life, Vainitoba has installed four chiefs, the most recent being Ratu Napolioni Ragiagia.

A strong proponent of education, Vainitoba expresses regret about his own failure to complete his education as a young man.  "I never completed my education because I followed the wrong crowd but through experiences I have been able to make a living for myself and have learned to value education," the Fiji Sun quoted him as saying on 8 January 2006.  He also emphasizes Christian values.  "I owe my long life to the simple bible principles of being obedient, respectful, loving others and trying to live a life that is right before the eyes of God," he said.

As of January 2006, Vainitoba has 9 children, 22 grandchildren, and 33 great-grandchildren. In September 2014 Vainitoba ran as a candidate in Fiji's national elections.

References

Year of birth missing (living people)
Living people
People from Nadi
Fijian chiefs